Ovstug is a rural locality (a village) and the administrative center of Ovstugskoye Rural Settlement, Zhukovsky District, Bryansk Oblast, Russia. The population was 729 as of 2010. There are 8 streets.

Geography 
Ovstug is located 33 km southeast of Zhukovka (the district's administrative centre) by road. Dubroslavichi is the nearest rural locality.

References 

Rural localities in Zhukovsky District, Bryansk Oblast
Bryansky Uyezd